The Mott criterion describes the critical point of the metal–insulator transition. The criterion is

where  is the electron density of the material and  the effective bohr radius. 
The constant , according to various estimates, is 2.0, 2.78,4.0, or 4.2.

If the criterion is satisfied (i.e. if the density of electrons is sufficiently high) the material becomes conductive (metal) and otherwise it will be an insulator.

See also
Hubbard model
Bohr radius
Mott insulator

References

Quantum phases